Julia Aguado Fernández (born 2 May 2000) is a Spanish footballer who plays as a midfielder for Levante. Her last team was Valencia CF.

Club career
Aguado started her career at Valencia B, remaining at Valencia up to 2022.

References

External links
Profile at La Liga

2000 births
Living people
Women's association football midfielders
Spanish women's footballers
People from Horta Sud
Sportspeople from the Province of Valencia
Footballers from the Valencian Community
Valencia CF Femenino players
Primera División (women) players
Segunda Federación (women) players
Levante UD Femenino players